East Side Story is the fourth studio album by new wave group Squeeze. The album peaked at number 19 in the UK Albums Chart, spending 26 weeks in the listing.

The album marked a shift from the new wave sound of their earlier work, as it contained songs influenced by rockabilly, R&B, blue-eyed soul, Merseybeat, and psychedelia among other genres.  It also contained Squeeze's last top 10 UK single, "Labelled with Love". It was the first album to feature new keyboardist Paul Carrack, replacing Jools Holland who had departed in early 1981. He sang lead on the track "Tempted", which became Squeeze's first U.S. chart hit.  Shortly after the release of this album, Carrack left the band for a solo career, but he returned to Squeeze for a time in the early 1990s, playing and singing on the Some Fantastic Place album.

In the UK, East Side Story was reissued on CD in 1997 with two album outtakes, as part of the band's Six of One... box set. The set included the band's first six studio albums, all digitally remastered. A year later, each separate CD (including the expanded East Side Story) was made available for individual purchase. In 2007, the album was digitally remastered and released in Japan. It contained two extra bonus tracks, both taken from B-sides from the album's singles; "Trust" and "Yap, Yap, Yap".

Recording
The initial concept for the album, proposed by manager Jake Riviera, was for Squeeze to record a double album with one side produced by Elvis Costello, another by Dave Edmunds, a third by Nick Lowe and the fourth by Paul McCartney. Although all producers were willing, the logistical difficulty of assembling the four producers ultimately made the plan impossible. In the end, the album was narrowed down to a single disc and was largely produced by Costello and Roger Bechirian, though Dave Edmunds produced the opening track, "In Quintessence".

In the studio, Costello, in the line of his longtime producer Nick Lowe, served more as a creative advisor while Bechirian handled the technical aspect of production. Bechirian explained, "Elvis sat there and pontificated a lot about this, that, and the other and I got on with getting the stuff down and rallying the band. I mean, Elvis did have an influence to some extent, but it wasn't that great". Chris Difford spoke glowingly of Costello's influence, saying, "I was in complete awe of working with him. It was a great challenge to come in every day with a lyric that would be better than the one he might come up with. ... I could tell which were the weak ones just by looking at his face". Costello later recorded a version of the album's "Someone Else's Heart" for a yet-to-be-compiled Squeeze tribute album in the 2010s.

The album was halfway completed when John Lennon was assassinated on 8 December 1980. The band were in the studio at the time; Difford recalled, "We went into the studio and a dozen or so musicians just dropped in. We cracked some beers and just played John Lennon songs the whole day. It was highly emotional".

Music
Simru Sonmez-Erbil opined that East Side Story was "more blended with their post-punk sound" and that it "demonstrated the band's ability to make any musical styling work". The album saw the band diverging from their traditional new wave sound and integrating elements of progressive rock, psychedelia, rockabilly, soul and Western.

Reception

In 1989, the Toronto Star music critics took a look over the albums they had reviewed in the past four years to include in a list based on "commercial impact to social import, to strictly musical merit." East Side Story was placed at number 2 on the list, only being beaten by Thriller by Michael Jackson. The Toronto Star went on to note that "songwriters Chris Difford and Glenn Tilbrook hit their creative peak in 1981, grafting Motown rhythms, country melodies and close harmonies onto a nervy New Wave soundtrack. At once ironic and sentimental, East Side Story is a masterpiece of kitchen-sink drama, from the shattered war bride in "Labelled With Love" to the harried housewife of "Woman's World"." The New York Times praised the album as an "exceptionally satisfying pop record".

Bechirian later said of the album, "I think the sound they got was amazing on that record. I'm really, really pleased with it. I think it's one of the best works that I've been involved with". Difford named the LP one of the two great albums that Squeeze ever made.

Track listing
All tracks written by Chris Difford and Glenn Tilbrook except where noted.

Side A
 "In Quintessence" – 2:55 (Produced by Dave Edmunds, assisted by Neil King)
 "Someone Else's Heart" – 3:00
 "Tempted" – 4:02
 "Piccadilly" – 3:26
 "There's No Tomorrow" – 3:27
 "Heaven" – 3:49
 "Woman's World" – 3:42

Side B
 "Is That Love" – 2:31
 "F-Hole" – 4:41
 "Labelled with Love" – 4:44
 "Someone Else's Bell" – 3:08
 "Mumbo Jumbo" – 3:13
 "Vanity Fair" – 3:09
 "Messed Around" – 2:42

Bonus tracks (1997 reissue)
"The Axe Has Now Fallen" – 3:51
 "Lookin' for a Love" (James Alexander, Zelda Samuels) – 3:00 (Produced by Nick Lowe)

Bonus tracks (2007 Japanese Remaster)
 "Trust" – 1:46
 "Yap Yap Yap" – 4:14

Personnel

Squeeze
 Chris Difford – rhythm guitars, backing vocals, lead vocals on "Someone Else's Heart" and "Heaven"
 Glenn Tilbrook – lead vocals, lead guitars
 Paul Carrack – keyboards, backing vocals, lead vocals on "Tempted"
 John Bentley – bass, backing vocals
 Gilson Lavis – drums

Additional personnel
 Del Newman – orchestra arrangements 
 Elvis Costello – additional vocals on "Tempted", backing vocals on "There's No Tomorrow"

Production
 Dave Edmunds – producer (1)
 Neill King – assistant producer (1)
 Roger Bechirian – producer (2-15)
 Elvis Costello – producer (2-15)
 Nick Lowe – producer (16)
 Bob Bromide – photography

Charts

Album

Singles

References
Citations

Sources

External links

Squeeze (band) albums
1981 albums
A&M Records albums
Albums produced by Roger Bechirian
Albums produced by Elvis Costello